The Macedonia national junior handball team is the national under–20 Handball team of Macedonia, representing Macedonia in international matches.

Current squad
The following squad was selected for the 2017 Men's Junior World Handball Championship .

Head coach: Ilija Temelkovski

Assistant coach: Ice Sokoleski

References

External links

IHF profile

Men's national junior handball teams
Handball in North Macedonia
Handball